Beatrice Alice Hicks (January 2, 1919 – October 21, 1979) was an American engineer, the first woman engineer to be hired by Western Electric, and both co-founder and first president of the Society of Women Engineers. Despite entering the field at a time where engineering was seen as an inappropriate career for a woman, Hicks held a variety of leadership positions and eventually became the owner of an engineering firm. During her time there, Hicks developed a gas density switch that would be used in the U.S. space program, including the Apollo moon landing missions.

Early life

Beatrice Hicks was born in 1919 in Orange, New Jersey, to William Lux Hicks, a chemical engineer, and Florence Benedict. Hicks decided at an early age that she wished to be an engineer. While her parents neither supported nor opposed Hicks' desired career path, some of her teachers and classmates tried to discourage her from becoming an engineer, viewing it as a socially unacceptable role for a woman. She graduated from Orange High School in 1935 and received a bachelor's degree in chemical engineering from Newark College of Engineering (now New Jersey Institute of Technology) in 1939, one of only two women in her class. During college, Hicks worked in the treasury office of an Abercrombie & Fitch store as a telephone operator, and in the university's library. After receiving her undergraduate degree, Hicks stayed at Newark College of Engineering for three years as a research assistant, where she studied the history of Edward Weston's inventions and took additional classes at night.

Career

In 1942 Hicks took a job at the Western Electric Company, designing and testing quartz crystal oscillators in Kearny, New Jersey. She was the first woman to be employed by Western Electric as an engineer, and she spent three years working there. Upon the death of her father, she joined the Bloomfield, New Jersey based Newark Controls Company, a metalworking firm that her father had founded. Hicks served as chief engineer and then as vice president in charge of engineering, before purchasing control of the company from her uncle in 1955. Hicks designed and patented a gas density switch later used in the U.S. space program, including the moon landing, and was a pioneer in the field of sensors that detected when devices were reaching structural limits. Hicks authored several technical papers on the gas density switch. While at Newark Controls Hicks pursued a master's degree in physics, which she received in 1949 from the Stevens Institute of Technology. While pursuing a master's degree from the Stevens Institute of Technology, Hicks completed some graduate electrical engineering courses at Columbia University.

In 1950 Hicks and other women based on the East coast of the United States began meeting in an organization, the goal of which was to advance female engineers and increase female participation in engineering. The organization was incorporated as the Society of Women Engineers two years later. Hicks served as the president of the organization for two consecutive terms, from 1950 to 1952. In 1963 the Society of Women Engineers presented their highest honor, the Society of Women Engineers Achievement Award, to Hicks. Hicks toured the United States, championing the cause of female engineers through outreach and speaking engagements. She believed that while female engineers would initially be closely watched, they would also be quickly accepted.

In 1948 Hicks married fellow engineer Rodney Duane Chipp, who held two director-level engineering positions before starting a consulting firm. In 1960 the couple were selected by the National Society of Professional Engineers for a month-long research and speaking tour of South America, which focused on international cooperation between American and South American engineers. When Chipp died in 1966, Hicks sold off Newark Controls Company and took over her late husband's consulting business. Hicks was also selected to serve on the Defense Advisory Committee for Women in Services between 1960 and 1963, was the director of the First International Conference of Women Engineers and Scientists, and represented the United States at four International Management Congresses.

Hicks died on October 21, 1979, in Princeton, New Jersey.

Awards and professional honors

Because of her role in Newark Controls Company, Mademoiselle magazine named Hicks "Woman of the Year in Business" in 1952. In 1978 Hicks was invited to join the National Academy of Engineering, the highest professional honor in engineering, and became the sixth woman to join the organization.  In 2002 Hicks was inducted into the National Women's Hall of Fame.

Hicks received honorary doctorates from Hobart and William Smith College, Rensselaer Polytechnic Institute, Stevens Institute of Technology, and Worcester Polytechnic Institute. She was the first female recipient of an honorary doctorate from Rensselaer Polytechnic Institute. She was a member of both the American Society of Mechanical Engineers and the Institute of Electrical and Electronics Engineers.

Hicks invented a special gas-density monitor for which she received a patent, this monitor proved to be valuable in the rapidly growing American space program.

In 2017, Hicks was inducted into the National Inventors Hall of Fame.

References

External links
Profile at the National Women's Hall of Fame
Profile at the Society of Women Engineers

1919 births
1979 deaths
American women engineers
New Jersey Institute of Technology alumni
Stevens Institute of Technology alumni
Rensselaer Polytechnic Institute alumni
Orange High School (New Jersey) alumni
People from Orange, New Jersey
Members of the United States National Academy of Engineering
Engineers from New Jersey
20th-century American engineers
20th-century women engineers
20th-century American women